First Methodist Episcopal Church of Rome is a historic Methodist Episcopal church building located at Rome in Oneida County, New York.  It includes the original brick and stone church building, completed in 1868, and the Ninde Memorial Chapel, added in 1910–1911.  The church is a 2-story, three-bay-wide building with a spire and bell tower.  It has a slate-covered gable roof. The chapel is a -story, four-bay-wide, red brick building on a cut stone foundation.

It was listed on the National Register of Historic Places in 2010.

References

Churches on the National Register of Historic Places in New York (state)
Churches completed in 1868
19th-century Methodist church buildings in the United States
Churches in Oneida County, New York
Rome, New York
National Register of Historic Places in Oneida County, New York
1868 establishments in New York (state)